Al-Malakia Football Club is a South Sudanese football club located in Juba, South Sudan which as of 2015 played in the South Sudan Premier League, at the 7,000 capacity Juba Stadium.

In 2013 the club won the South Sudan National Cup.

Honours
South Sudan National Cup
Winners (2 time): 2013; 2014

CAF Confederations Cup

Overall

Matches 

Notes:

P: Preliminary Round

CAF Champions League

Overall

Matches 

Notes:

P: Preliminary Round

References

External links

Team profile – footballzz.com
Gurtong.net

Football clubs in South Sudan